St. Thomas' Episcopal Church is a parish of the Episcopal Church in Owings Mills, Baltimore County, Maryland, part of the Diocese of Maryland. It is noted for its historic parish church, built in 1743.

History
Construction was authorized in 1742 by the Province of Maryland to provide a "Chapel of Ease" for early inhabitants of the Garrison Forest. Rev. Thomas Craddock was appointed first minister on January 14, 1745.

On April 13, 1782, The Rev. John Andrews returned to Maryland from York, Pennsylvania to become rector of the church, known at the time as St. Thomas Church in Garrison Forest, a position he held until 1784. Early members included Christopher Gist, John Eager Howard (for whom the nearby Howard County is named), Sequoyah, and his mother, Wut-teh.

Architecture
The original building, built in 1743 of salmon red brick, was a 56 x 36 foot (17 x 11m) rectangle. Eight windows with round arch tops lighted the building, four on each of the long walls. These retain much of their original 1743 glass. There were also three similar windows on the short liturgical west wall and a small window near the peak of the roof. (The building sits on an angle, so that liturgical west is actually southwest.) The entrance was in the liturgical south wall. It had a wide, brick paved, center aisle  and white box pews, both of which remain.

In the late 19th century, the door in the south wall was removed and an entrance created by removing the center window from the west wall. In 1891 transepts and a small, barrel shaped, chancel were added, changing the simple rectangle into a cruciform. There are lancet windows in the east end, one created by John LaFarge depicting the Ascension. A Tiffany window was added later. The transepts have rose windows in yellow, brown, green and colourless glass.

In 1970, a major restoration of the church was accomplished. This included the addition of a narthex to the liturgical west, providing access both to the church and to a new basement.

Historical credentials
 A roadside plaque was erected 1936 by Maryland State Roads Commission. Inscription reads "A frontier parish church authorized by Act of Assembly 1742 as “a Chapel of Ease for the Forest Inhabitants” of Saint Paul's Parish (Baltimore). Reverend Thomas Craddock inducted as first minister January 14, 1745."
The church was added to the National Register of Historic Places on May 24, 1979, reference number 79001117.

Graveyard
The cemetery contains the graves of many of the area's prominent people. Many date back to the 18th century, although most of the older markers are unreadable.

Notable burials
 Hetty Cary, best remembered for making the first three battle flags of the Confederacy (along with her sister and cousin).
 Samuel Owings, who is buried there, was a successful miller for whom Owings Mills was named.
 Edgar Allan Poe (1871–1961), Attorney General of Maryland and quarterback of Princeton Tigers
 Sam Shoemaker, born in the parish and who helped found Alcoholics Anonymous.

Gallery

See also
 List of post 1692 Anglican parishes in the Province of Maryland

References

External links

, including photo from 1979, at Maryland Historical Trust

Churches on the National Register of Historic Places in Maryland
Churches completed in 1743
Episcopal church buildings in Maryland
Churches in Baltimore County, Maryland
Georgian architecture in Maryland
Anglican parishes in the Province of Maryland
18th-century Episcopal church buildings
Buildings and structures in Owings Mills, Maryland
National Register of Historic Places in Baltimore County, Maryland
1743 establishments in Maryland